Geza Nagy-Csomag (born 1903, date of death unknown) was a Romanian footballer who played as a striker.

International career
Geza Nagy-Csomag played three friendly matches for Romania in which he scored two goals, making his debut on 31 May 1925 under coach Teofil Morariu in a 4–2 away victory against Bulgaria. He scored one goal in each of his following two games played for the national team, a 6–1 victory against Bulgaria and a 4–2 victory against Turkey.

References

External links
 

1903 births
Year of death missing
Romanian footballers
Romania international footballers
Place of birth missing
Association football forwards
Liga I players
Stăruința Oradea players
Romanian football managers
CSM Jiul Petroșani managers